Qaryat Āl Sahlān is a village by the Euphrates river, located in Al-Hilla District, Babil Governorate, in central Iraq, about 20 km southwest of the main city Al Hillah.

Notes

External links
 Qaryat Āl Sahlān: Iraq

Populated places in Babil Governorate
Populated places on the Euphrates River